Louisiana Highway 161 (LA 161) is a state highway located in Claiborne Parish, Louisiana.  It runs  in a southwest to northeast direction from LA 2 Alt. in Gordon to the Arkansas state line.

The route is entirely rural, providing a connection between highways leading to Haynesville and Homer in Claiborne Parish with Arkansas Highway 15 leading to El Dorado, Arkansas.  Though it travels diagonally, LA 161 carries north–south directional banners.

Route description
The route proceeds northeast through a rural area covered by pine forests. After , LA 161 intersects LA 520, which heads south to LA 2 Alt. at a point known as Colquitt.   later, after having curved slightly to the north, LA 161 crosses the state line into Union County, Arkansas, where it continues toward El Dorado as Arkansas Highway 15 (AR 15).

The route is classified as a rural major collector by the Louisiana Department of Transportation and Development (La DOTD) with an average daily traffic volume of 920 in 2013.

History
In the original Louisiana Highway system in use between 1921 and 1955, the modern LA 161 was part of State Route 557.  Route 557 was designated in 1930 by an act of the state legislature.  Its route comprised several disconnected segments branching out from the Homer area, many of which were decommissioned prior to the 1955 Louisiana Highway renumbering.

LA 161 was created in the 1955 renumbering following the northernmost segment of former Route 557.  Its route has remained the same to the present day.

Major intersections

See also

References

External links

Maps / GIS Data Homepage, Louisiana Department of Transportation and Development

0161
Transportation in Claiborne Parish, Louisiana